Karl-Heinz Wolf (born 4 July 1951) is a German biathlete. He competed in the 20 km individual event at the 1976 Winter Olympics.

References

External links
 

1951 births
Living people
German male biathletes
Olympic biathletes of East Germany
Biathletes at the 1976 Winter Olympics
People from Meiningen
Sportspeople from Thuringia